Bonita Vista High School (BVH) is a public, four-year (grade levels 9–12) high school located in the city of Chula Vista, California.  It is part of the Sweetwater Union High School District, and offers both Advanced Placement and International Baccalaureate classes. The mascot is a Baron.

History
Bonita Vista High School opened in fall 1966 at a construction cost of $2.5 million. A student committee chose the Baron mascot over a Patriot and a Crusader.

Academics 
The school is placed as the number 1 school of the Sweetwater Union High School District, with an Academic Performance Index score of 851 for the 2011 school year, meeting the statewide standard and exceeding amongst other schools in the same district.

Athletics
In 2015, Baron athletic teams won California Interscholastic Federation championships in football and girls' tennis. The football team plays games off-campus at Southwestern College.

Performing arts
BVH has two competitive show choirs, the mixed-gender group "The Music Machine" and the all-female "Sound Unlimited". The school formerly had an all-male group, "Barontones". The Music Machine and Sound Unlimited have both advanced to national-level competitions. The Music Machine was one of the most progressive show choirs in the western United States in the late 1900s. The program hosts an annual competition, San Diego Sings!

Notable alumni
 Matt Cameron, drummer of Pearl Jam and Soundgarden
 Charisma Carpenter, actress
 Costa Dillon, writer
 Hannah Flippen, softball player
 Byron Frisch, football player
 David Garza, Paralympic footballer
 Shirley Horton, politician
 Guido Knudson, MLB player (2015)
 Jennifer Lalor, soccer player and coach
 John Macaulay, NFL player (1984)
 Ramon Martin Del Campo, soccer player
 
 Steve Peace, politician
 Raquel Pomplun, Playboy 2013 Playmate of the Year
 David Schipper, professional soccer player
 Scott Shields, football player
 Joel Zumaya, baseball player

See also
List of high schools in San Diego County, California
List of high schools in California

References

External links

Bonita Vista High School Website

Educational institutions established in 1966
1966 establishments in California
High schools in San Diego County, California
International Baccalaureate schools in California
Public high schools in California
Education in Chula Vista, California